Camden is an unincorporated community located on Mississippi Highway 17 in Madison County, Mississippi, United States.

Although unincorporated, Camden has a post office and a zip code of 39045.

The town was named for Camden, South Carolina by Mississippi Governor William McWillie. McWillie was raised in Camden, South Carolina, and was in The South Carolina House of Representatives and the South Carolina Senate. He moved to Mississippi in 1845, where he was elected to Congress, and then, in 1858, he was elected the 22nd Governor of Mississippi.  He is buried in Kirkwood Cemetery, outside of Camden, Mississippi. Otis G. Collins, Illinois state representative, was born in Camden.

Education
It is in the Madison County School District.

Residents are zoned to Camden Elementary School. Residents are in turn zoned to Shirley S. Simmons Middle School and Velma Jackson High School.

References

Unincorporated communities in Madison County, Mississippi
Unincorporated communities in Mississippi